Barthelémy N'To (born 25 January 1963) is a Cameroonian wrestler. He competed at the 1984 Summer Olympics and the 1988 Summer Olympics.

References

1963 births
Living people
Cameroonian male sport wrestlers
Olympic wrestlers of Cameroon
Wrestlers at the 1984 Summer Olympics
Wrestlers at the 1988 Summer Olympics
Place of birth missing (living people)